Klaus Enders (2 May 1937 in Wetzlar, Germany – 20 January 2019) was a German Sidecar racer. He was a six-time FIM Sidecar World Champion and a four-time winner of the sidecar class at the Isle of Man TT. Enders decided to retire at the end of the 1970 season and try car racing, only to return to sidecars a year later, winning three more world titles before retiring for good at the end of 1974. His co-drivers were Wolfgang Kalauch and Ralf Engelhardt.

Enders died on 20 January 2019 at the age of 81 following a long illness.

References

1937 births
2019 deaths
Isle of Man TT riders
German motorcycle racers
People from Wetzlar
Sportspeople from Giessen (region)
Sidecar racers
People from the Rhine Province